This is a list of golfers who graduated from the Web.com Tour and Web.com Tour Finals in 2018. The top 25 players on the Web.com Tour's regular-season money list in 2018 earned PGA Tour cards for 2019. The Finals, which concluded on September 23, determined the other 25 players to earn PGA Tour cards and the priority order of all 50.

As in previous seasons, the Finals featured the top 75 players on the Web.com Tour regular season money list, players ranked 126–200 on the PGA Tour's regular-season FedEx Cup points list (except players exempt through other means), non-members of the PGA Tour with enough regular-season FedExCup points to place in the top 200, and special medical exemptions.

To determine the initial 2019 PGA Tour priority rank, the 25 Web.com Tour regular-season graduates will be alternated with the 25 Finals graduates. This priority order will then be reshuffled several times during the 2019 season.

Im Sung-jae and Denny McCarthy are fully exempt for the 2019 PGA Tour season after leading the full-season and Finals money lists, respectively.

2018 Web.com Tour Finals

*PGA Tour rookie in 2019
†First-time PGA Tour member in 2019, but ineligible for rookie status due to having played eight or more PGA Tour events in a previous season
 Earned spot in Finals through PGA Tour.
 Earned spot in Finals through FedEx Cup points earned as a PGA Tour non-member.
 Earned spot in Finals through a medical extension.
 Indicates whether the player earned his card through the regular season or through the Finals.

Results on 2019 PGA Tour

*PGA Tour rookie in 2019
†First-time PGA Tour member in 2019, but ineligible for rookie status due to having played eight or more PGA Tour events in a previous season
 Retained his PGA Tour card for 2020: won or finished in the top 125 of the FedEx Cup points list.
 Retained PGA Tour conditional status and qualified for the Web.com Tour Finals: finished between 126–150 on FedEx Cup list.
 Failed to retain his PGA Tour card for 2020 but qualified for the Web.com Tour Finals: finished between 150–200 on FedEx Cup list.
 Failed to retain his PGA Tour card for 2020 and to qualify for the Web.com Tour Finals: finished outside the top 200 on FedEx Cup list.

Kramer Hickok, Robert Streb, Cameron Davis, Fabián Gómez, and Hank Lebioda regained their cards through the 2019 Korn Ferry Tour Finals.

Winners on the PGA Tour in 2019

Runners-up on the PGA Tour in 2019

References

External links
Web.com Tour official site

Korn Ferry Tour
PGA Tour
Web.com Tour Finals graduates
Web.com Tour Finals graduates